Thaddeus Vincenty (born Tadeusz Szpila; 27 October 1920 – 6 March 2002) was a Polish American geodesist who worked with the U.S. Air Force and later the National Geodetic Survey to adapt three-dimensional adjustment techniques to NAD 83.
He devised Vincenty's formulae, a geodesic calculation technique published in 1975 which is accurate to about half a millimeter.

Vincenty's studies were interrupted by World War II, and he eventually arrived in a displaced persons camp. He arrived in the United States in 1947, and took his father's first name as his surname. Within months, he enlisted in the Air Force, and only became involved in computer programming and surveying in 1957. After studying via correspondence courses, he published his first research paper in 1963. After 30 years in the Air Force, he left Cheyenne, Wyoming, and took a position at National Geodetic Survey.

His contributions to the NAD 83 include the introduction of three dimensional Earth-centered coordinates, which unifies locations on Earth with locations in space, an essential development for the Global Positioning System.

Vincenty received the Department of Commerce Medal for Meritorious Service in 1982. He and his wife Barbara had one daughter, two sons, and three grandchildren at the time of his death.

See also
Geodesy
Geodesic
Earth radius
Vincenty's formulae

References

Excel Add-in by Tomasz Jastrzębski - complete Vincenty's direct and inverse formulae implementation with source code.

External links
Selected publications
Closed formulas for the direct and reverse geodetic problems, Pages 241–242, Journal of Geodesy, Volume 51, Number 3 (September, 1977).
Height-controlled three-dimensional adjustment of horizontal networks, Pages 37–43, Journal of Geodesy, Volume 54, Number 1 (March, 1980).
Methods of adjusting space systems data and terrestrial measurements, Pages 231–241, Journal of Geodesy, Volume 56, Number 3 (September, 1982).
 On the meaning of geodetic orientation, Pages 189–199, Journal of Geodesy, Volume 59, Number 2 (June, 1985).

1920 births
2002 deaths
Polish geodesists
Polish scientists
Polish emigrants to the United States
United States Air Force officers
Burials at Parklawn Memorial Park
People from Lwów Voivodeship
People from Montgomery County, Maryland